Iron boride refers to various inorganic compounds with the formula FexBy. Two main iron borides are FeB and Fe2B. Some iron borides possess useful properties such as magnetism, electrical conductivity, corrosion resistance and extreme hardness. Some iron borides have found use as hardening coatings for iron.  Iron borides have properties of ceramics such as high hardness, and properties of metal properties, such as thermal conductivity and electrical conductivity. Boride coatings on iron are superior mechanical, frictional, and anti-corrosive.  Iron monoboride (FeB) is a grey powder that is insoluble in water. FeB is harder than Fe2B, but is more brittle and more easily fractured upon impact.

Formation

Thermochemical Formation
Iron borides can be formed by thermochemically reacting boron rich compounds on an iron surface to form a mixture of iron borides, in a process known as boriding. There are a number of ways of forming boride coatings, including gas boriding, molten salt boriding, and pack boriding. Typically carbon tetraboride (B4C) or crystalline boron, is sintered on the iron surface in a tetrafluoroborate flux to form the coatings.
The boron atoms diffuse into the iron substrate between 1023 and 1373 K. They first form layers of Fe2B and then form layers of FeB.The range of compounds and compositions formed depends on the reaction conditions including temperature and surrounding environment.

Bulk FeB can be formed by simple reaction between iron and boron in a high-temperature inert gas furnace or in a microwave.

Synthesis
Iron boride nanoparticles have been formed by reducing iron boride salts in highly coordinating solvents using sodium borohydride. They have also been prepared by reducing iron salts using sodium borohydride:
4 FeSO4 + 8 NaBH4 +18 H2O → 2 Fe2B + 6 B(OH)3 + 25 H2 + 4 Na2SO4

Structure and Properties
The structures of FeB and Fe2B were known to be interstitial in early studies. FeB is orthorhombic and Fe2B adopts body-centered tetragonal structure.

FeB
FeB has zig-zag chains of boron atoms that are coordinated by seven iron atoms. Boron atoms have a slightly distorted mono-capped trigonal prismatic iron atom coordination and two boron atom neighbors. B-B single bond distance is 178 pm, Fe-B distance is 215–220 pm, and Fe-Fe distance is 240–272 pm. Each trigonal prism shares two rectangular faces with the nearby prisms, forming infinite prism columns.

FeB single crystal is taken by bond domains. Bond domains are parallel to the axis of easy magnetization and perpendicular to the axis of hard magnetization. The structure of closing domains is described as "rows and zigzags of asterisks". Its bond domains possess a distinguished direction in orientation of the boundaries of major domains with rhombic shape of closing domains.

FeB is a soft ferromagnetic compound that becomes paramagnetic above ~325 °C (617 °F). In air, FeB powders begins to react with the ambient oxygen above 300 °C, though bulk FeB materials are expected to be stable in air to much higher temperatures. FeB is an extremely hard compound (15-22 GPa as measured by Vickers indentation), but is not sought after on borided steels because FeB layers are brittle and prone to spalling off the steel or iron.

Fe2B
Fe2B contains single boron atoms in square anti-prismatic iron atom coordination.  Boron atoms are separated from each other and the shortest B-B distance is 213 pm. Fe-B distance is 218 pm and Fe-Fe distance is 240–272 pm.

Fe2B is a ferromagnetic compound that becomes paramagnetic at temperatures above 742 °C (1368 °F). In air, Fe2B powders begin to react with the ambient oxygen above 400 °C. The high hardness of Fe2B (18.7 GPa or 1907 HV as measured by Vickers indentation) is why homogeneous Fe2B layers are formed on top of iron or steel by boriding to make them more wear resistant.

FeB4

Applications

Boriding, also called boronizing, is often used to improve abrasion resistance, corrosion resistance, wear resistance, and oxidation resistance. It is used in oil and gas refinery, chemical extraction, automotive, agricultural, stamping, textile extrusion and injection molding industries.

Iron based coatings recently gained attention for their mechanical, frictional, and corrosion resistant properties. As compared to the ceramic or cermet type of materials people have used before, iron based materials are relatively inexpensive, less strategic, and can be produced economically by various thermal methods with ease of fabrication and machining.

See also
Boron steel
Iron tetraboride

References

Iron compounds
Borides
B